Timothy Gallagher (1840 – 24 August 1888) was a 19th-century Member of Parliament from the West Coast, New Zealand.

Gallagher, born in 1840, was from County Donegal in Ireland.

He represented the Westland North electorate from 1868 to 1870, when he resigned owing to urgent and private business affairs. During his time in parliament, he had advocated for the abolition of the provincial government system.

Gallagher fell ill with a cold. After a week, he unexpectedly died from pulmonary edema on 24 August 1888 at his home in Westport. He was survived by his wife and their nine children.

References

1840 births
1888 deaths
Members of the New Zealand House of Representatives
New Zealand MPs for South Island electorates
19th-century New Zealand politicians